Hans Adolph Aune (December 19, 1878 – February 26, 1931) was an American educator, businessman, and politician.

Aune was born in Baldwin, St. Croix County, Wisconsin. He graduated from Menominie High School and the River Falls Normal School. He was a teacher and school principal. Aune also served as the St. Croix County School Superintendent and worked for a publishing company. Aune served in the Wisconsin Assembly in 1931 as a Republican and a Progressive. He died in office by committing suicide in Madison, Wisconsin from drowning in Lake Monona.

Notes

External links

1878 births
1931 suicides
People from Baldwin, Wisconsin
University of Wisconsin–River Falls alumni
Businesspeople from Wisconsin
Educators from Wisconsin
Wisconsin Progressives (1924)
Republican Party members of the Wisconsin State Assembly
American politicians who committed suicide
Suicides in Wisconsin
Suicides by drowning in the United States